The rue de Siam (or Siam Street) is the main arterial street of Brest, a port city in Brittany, France. Its name comes from the arrival of three ambassadors led by Kosa Pan, sent by the King of Siam on the 29 June 1686 to meet Louis XIV in Versailles. They went with six mandarins, three translators, two secretaries and a retinue of servants, loaded with presents. They traveled on the boats l'Oiseau and La Maligne.

They crossed Saint-Pierre Street to go to the hostel of the same name. The inhabitants were so amazed that they renamed the street. The street was quite narrow before World War II.

The rue de Siam is quoted by Jacques Prévert in his poem Barbara.

Soi Charoen Krung 36 Alley, the location of French Embassy in Bangkok, was renamed in 2013 to "Rue de Brest" to commemorate diplomatic relations, reciprocating Rue de Siam.

Location
From the place de la Liberté, in the centre of Brest, the rue de Siam runs southwest to the Recouvrance Bridge, spanning the river Penfeld. Recouvrance is a working-class district, from old Brest, in contrast to the rue de Siam where there were all the chic stores and cafés of Brest, in the years 1950-60.

There used to be l’Épée Café on the right and Les Antilles Restaurant on the left. Midshipmen and officers from all nationalities used to have an aperitif at l’Épée and then, cross the rue de Siam to have supper at Les Antilles.

Gallery

See also
Rue de Brest, Bangkok; the counterpart street named after Brest, France in Bangkok
France-Thailand relations

References

External links

 Rue de Siam in 1900
 panoramic view of the Rue de Siam

Geography of Brest, France
History of Brest, France
Brest, France
Streets in Brest, France